Carlington Nyadombo (born 25 December 1985) is a Zimbabwean footballer who played as a defender, among others for Zimbabwe.

External links

1985 births
Living people
Association football defenders
Zimbabwean footballers
AmaZulu F.C. players
Polokwane City F.C. players
Royal Eagles F.C. players
Tshakhuma Tsha Madzivhandila F.C. players
Steenberg United F.C. players
Zimbabwean expatriates in South Africa
Expatriate soccer players in South Africa
Zimbabwe international footballers